Merve Adıyaman (born 12 September 1994) is a Turkish women's handballer, who plays in the Turkish Women's Handball Super League for Üsküdar Belediyespor, and the Turkey national team. The -tall sportswoman plays in the right back position.

References 

1994 births
Sportspeople from Istanbul
Turkish female handball players
Üsküdar Belediyespor players
Turkey women's national handball players
Living people
Mediterranean Games competitors for Turkey
Competitors at the 2022 Mediterranean Games
21st-century Turkish sportswomen